The 2021–22 Cal State Bakersfield Roadrunners men's basketball team represented California State University, Bakersfield in the 2021–22 NCAA Division I men's basketball season. The Roadrunners, led by 11th-year head coach Rod Barnes, played their home games at Icardo Center in Bakersfield, California as members of the Big West Conference.

Previous season
The Roadrunners finished the 2020–21 season 15–11, 9–7 in Big West play to finish in fifth place. As the #5 seed in the Big West tournament, they were defeated by #4 seed UC Davis in the quarterfinals.

Roster

Schedule and results

|-
!colspan=12 style=| Exhibition

|-
!colspan=12 style=| Non-conference regular season

|-
!colspan=12 style=| Big West regular season

|-
!colspan=9 style=| Big West tournament

Source

References

Cal State Bakersfield Roadrunners men's basketball seasons
Cal State Bakersfield Roadrunners
Cal State Bakersfield Roadrunners men's basketball
Cal State Bakersfield Roadrunners men's basketball